Lagartera is a municipality of Spain located in the province of Toledo, Castilla–La Mancha. The municipality spans across a total area of 81.02 km2 and, as of 1 January 2020, it has a registered population of 1,354.

History 
Part of the Campo Arañuelo, the settlement dates at least from the late 13th century. The hamlet of Lagartera belonged to the lordship of Oropesa, which segregated from the land of Ávila in the late 13th century. Lagartera was granted township on 21 January 1642. The village of Lagartera is renowned for its centuries-old tradition of embroidery, needlework and lace-making.

References
Citations

Bibliography
 
 

Municipalities in the Province of Toledo